CNCO is a Latin-American boy band formed in the first season of La Banda. It consists of Christopher Vélez, Richard Camacho, Zabdiel de Jesús and Erick Brian Colón; Joel Pimentel left the group in May 2021. They released their debut album Primera Cita in August 26, 2016, containing their third single and breakthrough hit "Reggaeton Lento (Bailemos)". The album garnered them a Lo Nuestro Award for Pop/Rock Album of the Year, a nomination for Latin Pop Album of the Year at the Billboard Latin Music Awards, and two Latin American Music Awards for Favorite Pop Album and Album of the Year.

The band released their second studio album CNCO in April 2018. They won a Latin AMA for Favorite Pop album and a Billboard Latin Music Award for Latin Pop Album of the Year. Their debut EP, Que Quiénes Somos, was nominated for Pop Album of the Year at the Premio Lo Nuestro 2021, but lost.

As a band, they have been nominated for several accolades, such as Premios Juventud, Latin AMAs, Billboard Latin Music Awards, IHeartRadio Music Awards, MTV Video Music Awards, and a Latin Grammy Awards for Best New Artist, winning most of them throughout the years and even being the first Latin boyband to win a Moonman (VMA).

Awards and nominations

Notes

References 

Lists of awards received by American musician
Lists of awards received by musical group